Hostice is a village and municipality in the Rimavská Sobota District of the Banská Bystrica Region of southern Slovakia.

History
In historical records the village was first mentioned in 1332 (1332 Gezeche, 1350 Geste, 1431 Gezthete). It belonged to noble families Ratoldoy and Lórantfy. In the 16th century it had to pay tributes to Turks. From 1938 to 1945 it belonged again to Hungary.

Genealogical resources

The records for genealogical research are available at the state archive "Statny Archiv in Banska Bystrica, Slovakia"

 Roman Catholic church records (births/marriages/deaths): 1761-1896 (parish A)
 Reformated church records (births/marriages/deaths): 1769-1895 (parish B)

See also
 List of municipalities and towns in Slovakia

External links
https://web.archive.org/web/20070513023228/http://www.statistics.sk/mosmis/eng/run.html
http://www.hostice.ou.sk/
http://www.hostice.gemer.org/
http://www.e-obce.sk/obec/hostice/hostice.html
Surnames of living people in Hostice

Villages and municipalities in Rimavská Sobota District